Dimitrije Nikolić (born 6 August 1997) is a Serbian professional basketball player SCM U Craiova in the Romanian Liga Națională.

Professional career
Nikolić started his career with Radnički in the Basketball League of Serbia. He also played for the Mladost Zemun, also in the Serbian League.

On 26 September 2017, Nikolić signed a multi-year contract with Partizan Belgrade.

On 21 May 2021, Nikolić signed a three-year contract for FMP. On 18 November 2021, he parted ways with FMP.

In April 2022, Zlatibor won the ABA League Second Division for the 2021–22 season following a 78–73 overtime win over MZT Skopje Aerodreom.

References

External links 
Profile at eurobasket.com
Profile at basketball.realgm.com
Profile at kkpartizan.rs

1997 births
Living people
ABA League players
Basketball League of Serbia players
KK FMP players
KK Mladost Zemun players
KK Partizan players
KK Sloboda Užice players
KK Sloga players
KK Zlatibor players
KKK Radnički players
Serbian expatriate basketball people in Romania
Serbian men's basketball players
Sportspeople from Kragujevac
Centers (basketball)